TuS Metzingen is a German women's handball team from Metzingen and Baden-Württemberg. It currently competes in the Frauen Handball-Bundesliga since 2012.

Kits

Honours
Handball-Bundesliga Frauen:
Finalist: 2016
Bronze: 2015, 2017, 2019
EHF Cup:
Finalists: 2015–16

European record

Team

Current squad
Squad for the 2022–23 season

Goalkeepers
 12  Marie Weiss
 16  Lea Schüpbach
 20  Rebecca Nilsson
Wingers
LW 
 2  Laura Godard
 96  Dagmara Nocuń
RW
 3  Magda Balsam
Line players
 7  Sabrina Tröster
 13  Julia Behnke
 26  Svenja Hübner

Back players
LB
 4  Katarina Pandza
 10  Lena Degenhardt
 24  Tyra Bessert
 98  Viktória Woth
CB
 14  Rebecca Rott
 18  Marte Juuhl Svensson
 21  Sandra Erlingsdóttir
RB
 22  Maren Weigel

Transfers
Transfers for the 2023–24 season 

Joining

Leaving
  Rebecca Nilsson (GK) (to  Skuru IK)

Notable former players

  Anna Loerper
  Julia Behnke
  Ewgenija Minevskaja
  Ina Großmann
  Isabell Roch
  Madita Kohorst
  Marlene Zapf
  Silje Brøns Petersen
  Delaila Amega
  Jasmina Janković
  Kelly Vollebregt
  Jesse van de Polder
  Bo van Wetering
  Bernadett Temes
  Luca Szekerczés
  Annamária Ilyés
  Júlia Hársfalvi
  Dorina Korsós
  Monika Kobylińska
  Katarzyna Janiszewska
  Patricia Kovács
  Tonje Løseth
  Simone Cathrine Petersen
  Madeleine Östlund

External links
 Official website

German handball clubs
Handball clubs established in 2000
Sport in Baden-Württemberg